Madrepora echinata is an unaccepted scientific name and may refer to two species of corals:
 Acropora echinata as described by Dana, 1846
 Ctenactis echinata as described by Pallas, 1766